Amarasiri Dodangoda (18 October 1941 – 30 May 2009) was a Sri Lankan politician, the former Minister of Justice and Law Reforms (2005–2009) and the second Chief Minister of the Southern Province (1993–1994).

Early life
Dodangoda was born on 18 October 1941 to a businessman William Appuhamy and Punyawathie Goonesekera in Dodangoda, Galle.
His had his primary education at Kukulalawatte Junior School, Ginimallegaha, Baddegama and had his tertiary level education both at Baddegama Ratnasara Vidyalaya and Richmond College, Galle. He graduated from the University of Ceylon, Peradeniya in 1963 with a B.A. degree and began his profession as a teacher at Vidyaloka Pirivena, Galle. Then he joined the Government service as an Education Officer in the latter part of the 1960s and this was followed by his entry to Sri Lanka Law College in 1971. Subsequently he was sworn in as an Attorney-at-Law of the Supreme Court of Sri Lanka. He was married and had two children.

Politics

He was a radical political figure in Southern Sri Lanka since 1971. He acted as Sri Lanka Freedom Party organiser for Baddegama, contested the Baddegama electorate and entered Parliament in 1983. In 1989 he contested the Galle multi member electorate and was elected to parliament. In 1993 he gave up his Parliamentary seat and when he was the elected Chief Minister of the Southern Province. He re-entered Parliament as an MP in 1994 when the Sri Lanka Freedom Party returned to government after 17 years and held various ministerial portfolios, including those of indigenous medicine, co-operatives, vocational training, local government, public administration and home affairs. He was appointed Minister of Justice and Law Reforms in 2005.  He was a firm supporter of then President, Mahinda Rajapakse.

Death
In March 2009, Dodangoda was admitted to the Colombo National Hospital due to an undisclosed ailment. On 30 May 2009, he died as a result of prolonged illness.

References

1942 births
2009 deaths
Sri Lankan Buddhists
Alumni of the University of Ceylon (Peradeniya)
Chief Ministers of Southern Province, Sri Lanka
Members of the 9th Parliament of Sri Lanka
Members of the 10th Parliament of Sri Lanka
Members of the 11th Parliament of Sri Lanka
Members of the 12th Parliament of Sri Lanka
Members of the 13th Parliament of Sri Lanka
Sinhalese politicians
Alumni of Richmond College, Galle
People from Galle
Local government and provincial councils ministers of Sri Lanka